Petar Bojo (born 8 January 1998) is a Bosnian professional footballer who plays as a defensive midfielder for Bosnian Premier League club Igman Konjic, on loan from Zrinjski Mostar.

Club career

Early career
Bojo started off his youth career at the youth team of Široki Brijeg, before joining the Vysočina Jihlava youth team in 2017.

After half a year of playing at Vysočina Jihlava, Bojo went to Bosnian Premier League club Vitez and thus signed a contract with his first ever senior team.

Mladost Doboj Kakanj
After Vitez got relegated to the First League of FBiH in the 2017–18 Bosnian Premier League season, Bojo left Vitez and shortly after, on 27 June 2018, signed a two year contract with Mladost Doboj Kakanj.

He made his debut for Mladost on 21 July 2018, in a 0–0 home draw against newly promoted Zvijezda 09. He scored his first goal two games after the Zvijezda 09 game, on 11 August 2018, in a 2–2 away draw against Krupa.

In the 2018–19 Bosnian Premier League season, Bojo was recognized as not only one of the best Mladost Doboj Kakanj players, but was also recognized as one of the best young players in the whole league as well.

Željezničar
On 27 June 2019, Bojo signed a two-year contract with Željezničar for a €30.000 transfer fee.

He made his official debut for Željezničar on 20 July 2019, in a 0–0 home league draw against Borac Banja Luka. In that same game, he also got a red card in the 80th minute after making a foul on Borac player Demir Jakupović and then getting a second yellow card.

He scored his first goal for Željezničar on 31 August 2019, in a thrilling 5–2 home league match, Sarajevo derby win against fierce rivals Sarajevo.

In July 2020, Bojo ruptured his medial collateral ligament of his right leg in a training session and it was reported that the injury would sideline him for two months.

In his first match since recovering from the injury, he scored a goal in Željezničar's 2020–21 Bosnian Cup second round win against Goražde on 21 October 2020.

On 18 January 2022, it was announced that Bojo terminated his contract with Željezničar and left the club on mutual agreement.

Zrinjski Mostar
One day following him leaving Željezničar, on 19 January 2022, Bojo signed a two-and-a-half year contract with Zrinjski Mostar.

International career
Bojo represented Bosnia and Herzegovina on various youth levels. He played for the U17, U18 and U19 national team levels, before getting called up to the U21 national team in November 2018.

Bojo made his U21 international debut for Bosnia and Herzegovina on 19 November 2018, in a 2–0 home win against Azerbaijan.

Career statistics

Club

Honours
Zrinjski Mostar
Bosnian Premier League: 2021–22

References

External links
Petar Bojo at Sofascore

1998 births
Living people
People from Kiseljak
Croats of Bosnia and Herzegovina
Bosnia and Herzegovina footballers
Premier League of Bosnia and Herzegovina players
NK Vitez players
FK Mladost Doboj Kakanj players
FK Željezničar Sarajevo players
HŠK Zrinjski Mostar players
FK Igman Konjic players
Bosnia and Herzegovina youth international footballers
Bosnia and Herzegovina under-21 international footballers
Association football midfielders